The BAFANL (BAFA National Leagues) are the primary American football domestic League competition in Great Britain. The League is run by the British American Football Association to coordinate contact football within England, Scotland and Wales. The top level is the Premier Division and the BritBowl is the annual final championship game.

Originally formed in the 1980s, the League was reformed in 2010 following the collapse of the British American Football League, which had run in a number of different guises since the early 1980s. Previous names of the League were the UKAFL (UK American Football League), the Budweiser League and the BNGL (British National Gridiron League). From 1998 until 2005 the League was known as the BSL (British Senior League). Tensions grew between the directors of BAFL and those of the British American Football Association, the governing body throughout 2009 and at the beginning of 2010, BAFL formally, but unconstitutionally, withdrew from BAFA. This led to uproar from the teams within BAFL, ultimately signalling the end for BAFL as an entity. The league ceased operations on 1 April 2010 and was replaced by the BAFA Community Leagues for the 2010 season, rebranding in 2011 to become the BAFNL. Notable players to have come from the BAFANL who have gone on to play in the NFL are Efe Obada, Aden Durde, Jermaine Allen and Marvin Allen.

Pete Ackerley currently heads the day-to-day operations of the BAFANL, The League operates is a summer season and begins in April and plays through until August, with Play-off games running into September. There are currently 70 teams who compete in 12  regional divisions across three levels of football. The 12 teams who contest both the two BAFA Premier Division's compete to reach the annual Britbowl final, whereas teams in the second and third level aim to earn promotion to the Division above attempting to reach one of the six regional bowl finals. The current champions are the Manchester Titans who won the 2022 Britbowl as well as the Premier Division North, they are first times winners after knocking off the London Warriors in the 2022 Britbowl final.

History

American football was introduced to the United Kingdom during the early part of the 20th century by American servicemen stationed in the country. The first recorded match took place on 23 November 1910 at Crystal Palace, London, where a team made up of the crew from USS Idaho defeated their counterparts from USS Vermont 19–0. During the Second World War, matches were played by American and Canadian servicemen stationed in the UK at venues throughout the country. This included the 'Tea Bowl' game played at the White City Stadium in 1944, and this was followed by the creation of the United States Armed Forces Europe (USAFE) league in 1946. This league consisted of teams from American military bases throughout Europe, with one of the league's three conferences made up of teams based in the UK – teams from this conference won the league championship thirteen times until the competition ceased in 1993.

The first teams open to British players were established in 1983, and competition began the following year in the form of a series of one-off games. The match results were compiled into a 'Merit Table', with teams playing more than three games eligible for the championship—the first champions were the London Ravens, who won all ten of their matches.

Tensions grew between the directors of British American Football League and those of the British American Football Association, the governing body throughout 2009 and at the beginning of 2010, BAFL formally, but unconstitutionally, withdrew from BAFA. This led to uproar from the teams within BAFL, ultimately signalling the end for BAFL as an entity. The league ceased operations on 1 April 2010. The league was replaced by the BAFA Community Leagues for the 2010 season. This organisation, run under the umbrella of the governing body, rebranded in 2011 to become the BAFA National Leagues. Hundreds of clubs have since been formed, playing both full contact football and flag football at senior, university and youth level. Many of these clubs have since folded, renamed or merged with other local teams, but a few of the older clubs survive today.

Season format

The BAFANL is contested by teams from England, Scotland and Wales. Teams from Northern Ireland compete under competition from American Football Ireland and therefore do not compete with teams from the rest of the United Kingdom. The regular season format consists of two Conferences, the Northern Football Conference (NFC) and Southern Football Conference (SFC), within each Conference there are three levels of competition starting at Premier Division and filtering down to Divisions One and Two. Teams can be switched between the NFC and SFC depending on the geographic location of each teams at the beginning of the season. In the past when Division One has been loaded with teams from the middle of England there has been a designated Midlands Football Conference (MFC), although this is currently defunct. The current format consists of a ten-game season for Premier Division teams and First Division teams, with the Second Division now playing eight games. The League is a summer sport in the UK and runs opposite to the NFL, with teams beginning pre-season training in January to compete in the regular season that takes place between April and August. The play-off games usually running into September, with the finals taking place towards the middle of the month. Following the climax of the regular season, the eventual winners and runners-up from both Premier Division's make up the semifinal in which they will compete to win a place in the Britbowl. Since 2014, The Britbowl winners will automatically qualify to play in the IFAF Europe Champions League for the following season. European games run aside the clubs domestic season, prior to 2014 qualification was for the EFAF Cup.

Unlike American Football competitions in North America such as the NFL, NCAA and CFL, American Football in the UK runs a similar promotion and relegation format to that of Association football (soccer) in the United Kingdom. Teams from the First and Second Division aim to win promotion to the division above by attempting to reach their respective play-off final. The team that finishes bottom of their Division (excluding Division Two) are relegated to their relevant Regional division in the level below. Although there is no active on-the-field promotion process to Division Two, there are a number of Non-League sides who operate in the "Associate Process" that are active but instead of playing to win promotion to the League they must gain entry by application to the British American Football Association in which each applying team must meet a number of different criteria from playing a number of assessed exhibition games, sustainability, facilities and good coaching practice. BAFA have the ability to relegate any BAFANL team back to Associate Status if that club are failing to make the standard expected of them. If a team withdraw from the season but indicate their wish to continue operating then they will spend the following season at Associate level.

The game itself is run following the latest NCAA rules, this has been in practice since the 2005 season. There is currently no limit on Roster size, unlike the NFL's 53 man setup. Unlike the majority of European leagues, British American football is currently amateur as opposed to semi-professional. Clubs largely operate and turnover financially through sponsorship and player subscriptions. Where as it is not currently illegal for a team to pay a wage to coaches, they are forbidden from paying a wage to players. Players currently have to pay a yearly fee to BAFA as well as contributing to the club they play for, regardless of stature or whether the player has been a professional elsewhere. The transfer window for players being allowed to move teams usually opens in October and closes midway through the season in July. Transfers are all handled through an online portal registration system in which the player requests the move and has to wait for both teams to accept the deal before finalisation is sent to BAFA.

Players
Players in the BAFANL are largely made up of British nationals who due to the League's current status have to pay a subscription fee to both the League and their respective clubs. British league teams in earlier years were allowed to pay players and most teams had paid US import professionals. Clubs are currently not permitted to pay a wage to any player, but coaches and other staff members are able to receive a wage. There are currently no limits on Roster size unlike the NFL's 53 man roster. The minimum age of BAFANL contact player is 18 years old, however players are allowed to play to Youth football until the age of 19. Female players are currently permitted to participate in the League as well as the BAFA ran Women's National Football League. Premier League and some Division One sides tend to operate a try-out basis to recruit potential players over several training sessions, where as other sides tend to operate an inclusive grassroots approach with any player wishing to compete taken on board as long as they are fit enough to do so. A lot of Football recruitment tends to come from other sports largely former Rugby Union players.

In 2019 BAFA announced all Non-British players who play within League have to have a permanent residence address in the UK and had to have been residing in the country for six months and suspended all players who did not meet this criteria, this was largely brought in due to Leicester Falcons partnership with US College side Baker Wildcats who in turned signed a significant number of US Athletes to their side following promotion to the BAFA Premier North. Tamworth Phoenix flagged an incident with BAFA in which a Baker player had attempted to broker a deal to play with them, with the player reported Leicester had offered to pay a wage of £1,000 per month and a free master's degree. Leicester were forced to cut ties with the Baker athletes prior to the first game of the 2019 season, they were eventually relegated back to Division 1 with a 2–8 record.

Famous players to have played in the BAFANL include Efe Obada who played for the London Warriors in 2014, later moving into a career within the NFL. Aden Durde and Jermaine Allen of the London Olympians played in both the NFL Europe and the NFL, with Durde later staying in the NFL as a positional coach. Marvin Allen of the London Warriors also later moved to play in the NFL. Players to have come from the NFL to the BAFANL include Denver Broncos quarterback Bradlee Van Pelt and San Diego Chargers linebacker Jason Brisbane.

England's Rugby Union World Cup winning captain Martin Johnson and GB Olympics sprinter Dwain Chambers also played the sport briefly, as well as Television presenter Vernon Kay and actors Ricky Whittle and Chris Fountain.

Media coverage
The Britbowl as well as the Divisional Play-off finals have been on YouTube via DblCoverage.com and Onside Productions. The programmes feature in-game commentary and interviews. Onside began operating by streaming Nottingham Caesars games coined as "Caesars TV" in 2016 before being brought on by DblCoverage.com to broadcast the National finals as well as Great Britain national American football team games 

Double Coverage (DblCoverage.com) was the largest British American Football-focused media outlet and community hub, it featured news, league results and standings for all formats of the contact game, as well as opinion articles and editorials, their social media pages represented the largest online community of British American Football players and fans. however the site was taken down at the end of the 2019 season and the social media platform is now dormant. Sportank (previously Gridiron Hub) is now the UK's main British American football outlet and covers all of the topics that were previously featured on Double Coverage.

In 2019, Onside provided the livestream of the U19 Junior National Championship and BritBowl XXXIII for BBC Sport.

Other popular media platforms include the podcast Exs and O's and Britballin, the latter have also begun streaming games.

Stadiums
The use of Stadiums in the BAFANL is sporadic due to most clubs running on a budget that relies heavily on sponsorship and subscriptions. Most BAFANL clubs operate from Rugby Union clubs, University or High Schools sports fields or local athletics parks, however some teams do play inside larger sports stadiums which have seating capacities for spectators. The Britbowl itself has recently been played at Allianz Park in London and the Sixways Stadium in Worcester, while Division 1 and 2 finals are often hosted at the South Leeds Stadium. At present the Halton Spartans ground share of the Select Security Stadium with Rugby league team Widnes Vikings constitutes as the highest capacity stadium within the BAFANL with 13,350 seats. Other prominent stadiums that are currently in use in Britball include Manchester Titans home field at the National Speedway Stadium. Notable stadiums that have been used in the past includes Doncaster Mustangs use of the Keepmoat Stadium, London Olympians former home at the Crystal Palace Athletics Stadium, the AJ Bell Stadium by the Manchester Titans and De Montfort Park by Leicester Falcons.

Teams

There are currently 64 teams in the BAFANL who have full membership status. Over the years many teams have formed and folded with only a small handful of original teams from the early 1980s remaining. A lot of teams trace their heritage back through predecessor teams and a large number of BAFA sides have changed their identity on one or sometimes two occasions. Colchester Gladiators (formed in 1983) of Division Two are the oldest team to be operating in their original identity. Other original sides include the Birmingham Bulls, Chester Romans, Nottingham Caesars, East Kilbride Pirates and the Crewe Railroaders. Although the London Olympians are the most successful British side, the London Warriors hold the title following on from the BAFANL's official formation in 2010.

Having missed the 2020 season due to the COVID-19 pandemic, BAFA announced that for the 2021 season the BAFANL would be not using the three tier league system and operating from localised Divisions to minimize travel. This means that clubs will not return to their respective divisions until the 2022 season.

Premier Division 
The BAFANL Premier Division for the 2023 season comprises twelve teams, split into the North and South Divisions. The BAFA Premier Division North and the BAFA Premier Division South. Within each division each team plays each other twice. There will be 2 rounds of playoff football with the top ranked team in the North will host the second ranked team in the South whilst the top ranked team in the South will host the second ranked team in the North. The winners will then compete for the BritBowl. The team who finishes bottom of each division are relegated to Division 1 for the following season and are replaced by both of the Division 1 winners. Teams can be swapped between the North and South Divisions for a following season depending on the geographical location of teams that may be promoted to the division.

Premier North

Premier South

Division One

The BAFANL Division One is the second tier of British American Football, for the 2023 season it holds 30 teams, now divided into 5 Divisions. The Divisions are grouped into a North and South Divide with NFC standing for "Northern Football Conference" and the SFC being the "Southern Football Conference". The current individual names of the each Divisions are the NFC 1 Scotland, the NFC 1 Central, the NFC 1 South, the SFC 1 West and the SFC 1 East. The Scottish Division was introduced in 2023, this was part in due to East Kilbride's promotion to the Premier Division in 2022, coupled with Highland Stags promotion to Division 1. Initially this would have lead to Highland and Glasgow being aligned with English teams as far down as the Midlands. To counteract this BAFA automatically promoted the 4 remaining Scottish Division 2 teams in order to make a completely Division 1 level. Each team plays the others in their Division twice during the regular season as well as all teams playing two opponents on three occasions. There is no inter-division games until the playoffs with the top two teams in each division entering into what is potentially a three-game Play-off campaign with the initial games being played regionally. The winner of both the Northern and Southern Playoffs will win promotion to the Premier League and then face each other for the Division One Bowl game in order to take home the trophy. The team who finishes bottom of each division is relegated to Division Two.

NFC 1 Scotland

NFC 1 Central

NFC 1 South

SFC 1 West
~ Denotes B/Reserve Team affiliated to another BAFANL team.

SFC 1 East
~ Denotes B/Reserve Team affiliated to another BAFANL team.

Division Two
The BAFA Division Two is the third tier of British American Football with 2023 holding 23 teams across 5 Divisions. The Divisions are grouped into a North and South Divide with NFC standing for "Northern Football Conference" and the SFC being the "Southern Football Conference". The current individual names of the each Divisions are the NFC 2 West, the NFC 2 East, the SFC 2 West, the SFC 2 Central, and the SFC 2 East. Each team plays the others in their Division twice during the regular season as well as all teams playing two opponents on three occasions. Teams in the Central and East will play designated inter-divisional games, with these being the only cross-division games until the playoffs with the top two teams in each division entering into what is potentially a three-game Play-off campaign with the initial games being played regionally. The winner of both the Northern and Southern Playoffs will win promotion to Division One and then face other for the Division Two Bowl game in order to take home the trophy.

NFC 2 West

NFC 2 East

SFC 2 West

SFC 2 Central

SFC 2 East

Associate teams
New teams must undergo an indefinite associate period before they are granted full member status of the national leagues. A number of criteria must be met, involving successfully completing a number of games, recruiting a number of new players, proof of required finances and the creation of a club committee. Associate teams spend their seasons playing each other and League teams in what are essentially friendly fixtures. Some of the current Associate teams are also previous League teams that have dropped out of the BAFANL at some stage.

~ Denotes B/Reserve Team affiliated to another BAFANL team.
* Denotes team who took voluntary demotion from the League back to the Associate Process.
** Denotes team demoted from the League back to Associate status by BAFA.

Defunct teams
Former teams who competed in the BAFANL and have now ceased operating or have merged with other sides to form a current operating side within the present League structure.

Notable people

Notable Players and Coaches who have featured either in the BAFA National Leagues or any of its predecessor Leagues that have at any time represented the domestic game of American Football in the United Kingdom.

Winners

BritBowl

Winners of the Britbowl since the BAFA National Leagues 2010 formation.

Division One Bowl
For some seasons there has been a separate North and South Bowl final.

Division Two Bowl
For some seasons there has been a separate North and South Bowl final.

See also
Britbowl
NFL Europe
American football in the United Kingdom
British Universities American Football League

References

External links
 Official league website

American football leagues in the United Kingdom
American football leagues in Europe
2010 establishments in the United Kingdom
Sports leagues established in 2010
Professional sports leagues in the United Kingdom